Stoneacre may refer to:

Stoneacre (1884), a now-demolished mansion formerly located at the Frederick Law Olmsted Park
Stoneacre, Kent, a small National Trust property in southern England
Stoneacre Loop, the Stoneacre crossover on the Embsay and Bolton Abbey Steam Railway
Stoneacre Motor Group, a UK-based car dealership group